Puerto Rico competed at the 2011 World Championships in Athletics from August 27 to September 4 in Daegu, South Korea.

Team selection

A team of 8 athletes  was
announced to represent the country
in the event.  The team is led by last event's silver medalist, 400m hurdler Javier Culson.

The following athlete appeared on the preliminary Entry List, but not on the Official Start List of the specific event:

Medalists
The following competitor from Puerto Rico won a medal at the Championships

Results

Men

Women

References

External links
Official local organising committee website
Official IAAF competition website

Nations at the 2011 World Championships in Athletics
World Championships in Athletics
Puerto Rico at the World Championships in Athletics